Jürgen Roters (born 15 January 1949 in Coesfeld, North Rhine-Westphalia) is a German politician and member of the Social Democratic Party of Germany (SPD), as well as a former middle-distance runner. He was mayor of Cologne from 2009 to 2015. Roters studied law from 1968 until 1974, is married and has three children.

External links 
 Profile on Stadt-Koeln.de 

1949 births
Living people
People from Coesfeld
Social Democratic Party of Germany politicians
Mayors of Cologne
German male middle-distance runners